No Stranger to Danger may refer to:

No Stranger to Danger (Payolas album) (1982)
No Stranger to Danger (Lȧȧz Rockit album) (1985)